"Found a Cure" is a 1998 song by American recording artist Ultra Naté, released as the second single from her third album, Situation: Critical (1998). The radio mix of the song was remixed by English house music duo Full Intention. It reached number six on the UK Singles Chart, number two on the UK Dance Singles Chart and number-one on the US Billboard Hot Dance Club Songs chart. Additionally, the song was a top 10 hit also in Finland, Hungary and Scotland.

Critical reception
J.D. Considine from The Baltimore Sun noted how the guitar-hook "evokes" "Sunshine of Your Love" on "Found a Cure". Larry Flick from Billboard wrote, "It's not easy to follow a single like "Free," which is easily among the most revered dance singles of the last five years. Naté fearlessly faces the challenge with a jam that smartly doesn't aim to duplicate the tone of her now-classic hit. Instead, she and collaborators Mood II Swing and Danny Madden have cooked up a tune that has an infectious pop feel and a sturdy, club-credible house groove. The diva is in fine voice here and is matched by a muscular bassline and keyboard/guitar interplay that oozes with funk flavor. Not only an excellent way of introducing Naté's long-awaited new album, "Situation Critical", "Found a Cure" positions her for another lengthy reign atop many a DJ's playlist." A reviewer from Sunday Mirror commented, "Miss Nate proves there's more than Free in her locker with a pure floorfiller. A Gloria Gaynor for the Millennium."

Music video
A music video was produced to promote the single, directed by American film director Charles Stone III.

Track listing
 "Found a Cure" (Full Intention Radio Mix) – 3:32
 "Found a Cure" (Mood II Swing Radio Mix) – 4:07
 "Found a Cure" (Full Intention Club Mix) – 7:25
 "Found a Cure" (Mood II Swing Original Vocal Mix) – 8:27
 "Found a Cure" (Morillo's Classic Adventure) – 6:01
 "Found a Cure" (Morillo Swings with the Constipated Monkeys Edit) – 6:31
 "Found a Cure" (Classic String Mix) – 3:51

Charts

See also
 List of number-one dance singles of 1998 (U.S.)

References

1998 singles
1998 songs
Ultra Naté songs
Strictly Rhythm singles